In epidemiology, preventable fraction among the unexposed (PFu), is the proportion of incidents in the unexposed group that could be prevented by exposure. It is a synonym of the relative risk reduction.

It is used when an exposure reduces the risk, as opposed to increasing it, in which case its symmetrical notion is attributable fraction among the exposed.

Numerical example

See also 

 Population Impact Measures
 Preventable fraction for the population

References

Epidemiology
Medical statistics